Ali Hudzafi is a Singaporean football player. He plays currently for Hougang United in the S.League for 2017. Throughout his career, he has had two ACL injuries.

Club career

Tampines Rovers
Ali started his career with the Stags in their prime league team.

LionsXII
In 2013, he was called up to the LionsXII to play in the Malaysia Super League.  He make an appearance for the team against ATM FA as a last minute substitute.

Young Lions
After being released by the LionsXII, he move to the Young Lions to play in the Sleague which he played for 2 seasons. (2014–2015)

Hougang United
He joined Hougang United in 2016 but missed out on a majority of appearances in 2016 due to a long-term injury.

He was re-signed for 2017.

References

1992 births
Living people
Singaporean footballers
Singapore Premier League players
Association football goalkeepers
Home United FC players
Hougang United FC players